A household deity is a deity or spirit that protects the home, looking after the entire household or certain key members. It has been a common belief in paganism as well as in folklore across many parts of the world.

Household deities fit into two types; firstly, a specific deity typically a goddess often referred to as a hearth goddess or domestic goddess who is associated with the home and hearth, such as the ancient Greek Hestia.

The second type of household deities are those that are not one singular deity, but a type, or species of animistic deity, who usually have lesser powers than major deities. This type was common in the religions of antiquity, such as the lares of ancient Roman religion, the gashin of Korean shamanism, and cofgodas of Anglo-Saxon paganism. These survived Christianisation as fairy-like creatures existing in folklore, such as the Anglo-Scottish brownie and Slavic domovoy.

Household deities were usually worshipped not in temples but in the home, where they would be represented by small idols (such as the teraphim of the Bible, often translated as "household gods" in Genesis 31:19 for example), amulets, paintings, or reliefs. They could also be found on domestic objects, such as cosmetic articles in the case of Tawaret. The more prosperous houses might have a small shrine to the household god(s); the lararium served this purpose in the case of the Romans. The gods would be treated as members of the family and invited to join in meals, or be given offerings of food and drink.

Types

In many religions, both ancient and modern, a god would preside over the home.

Certain species, or types, of household deities existed. An example of this was the Roman Lares.

Many European cultures retained house spirits into the modern period.  Some examples of these include:

 Brownie (Scotland and England) or Hob (England) / Kobold (Germany) / Goblin / Hobgoblin
 Domovoy (Slavic)
 Nisse (Norwegian or Danish) / Tomte (Swedish) / Tonttu (Finnish)
 Húsvættir (Norse)

Although the cosmic status of household deities was not as lofty as that of the Twelve Olympians or the Aesir, they were also jealous of their dignity and also had to be appeased with shrines and offerings, however humble.  Because of their immediacy they had arguably more influence on the day-to-day affairs of men than the remote gods did.  Vestiges of their worship persisted long after Christianity and other major religions extirpated nearly every trace of the major pagan pantheons. Elements of the practice can be seen even today, with Christian accretions, where statues to various saints (such as St. Francis) protect gardens and grottos. Even the gargoyles found on older churches, could be viewed as guardians partitioning a sacred space.

For centuries, Christianity fought a mop-up war against these lingering minor pagan deities, but they proved tenacious.  For example, Martin Luther's Tischreden have numerous quite serious references to dealing with kobolds.<ref name="DWB">See Brüder Grimm, Wörterbuch", s.v. "kobold", "poltergeist", etc.</ref>  Eventually, rationalism and the Industrial Revolution threatened to erase most of these minor deities, until the advent of romantic nationalism rehabilitated them and embellished them into objects of literary curiosity in the 19th century.  Since the 20th century this literature has been mined for characters for role-playing games, video games, and other fantasy personae, not infrequently invested with invented traits and hierarchies somewhat different from their mythological and folkloric roots.

 Origins in animism and ancestor worship 

 Shinto as an exemplar of development 
The general dynamics of the origin and development of household deities over a considerable span may be traced and exemplified by the historically attested origins and current practices of the Shinto belief system in Japan. As the Japanologist Lafcadio Hearn put it:

Drawing the picture with broader strokes, he continues:

Furthermore,

Many Japanese houses still have a shrine (kamidana, kami shelf) where offerings are made to ancestral kami, as well as to other kami.

 Cultural evolution and survival 
Edward Burnett Tylor, one of the main founders of the discipline of cultural anthropology, spoke of survivals, vestiges of earlier evolutionary stages in a culture's development. He also coined the term animism. Tylor disagreed with Herbert Spencer, another founder of anthropology, as well as of sociology, about the innateness of the human tendency towards animistic explanations, but both agreed that ancestor worship was the root of religion and that domestic deities were survivals from such an early stage.

 Animism and totemism 
In contradistinction to both Herbert Spencer and Edward Burnett Tylor, who defended theories of animistic origins of ancestor worship, Émile Durkheim saw its origin in totemism. In reality this distinction is somewhat academic, since totemism may be regarded as particularized manifestation of animism, and something of a synthesis of the two positions was attempted by Sigmund Freud. In Freud's Totem and Taboo, both totem and taboo are outward expressions or manifestations of the same psychological tendency, a concept which is complementary to, or which rather reconciles, the apparent conflict. Freud preferred to emphasize the psychoanalytic implications of the reification of metaphysical forces, but with particular emphasis on its familial nature. This emphasis underscores, rather than weakens, the ancestral component.

 Domestic deities and ancestor worship 

 Jacob Grimm (1835) 

European folklorist Jacob Grimm did not hesitate to equate the Roman lar familiaris to the brownie. He explains in some detail in his Deutsche Mythologie:

 Thomas Keightley (1870) 

To underscore the equivalence of brownie, kobold and goblin, consider the words of the English historian and folklorist Thomas Keightly:

 MacMichael (1907) 
MacMichael elaborated his views on the folkloric belief complex as follows:

 New International Encyclopaedia 
Demonstrating that this evolution and functional equivalence has generally come to be accepted, and that their nature is indeed that proposed by Grimm, one may refer to the early twentieth century New International Encyclopaedia:

and also

 Origin of ancestor worship in animism 

 Hearn (1878) 
William Edward Hearn, a noted classicist and jurist, traced the origin of domestic deities from the earliest stages as an expression of animism, a belief system thought to have existed also in the neolithic, and the forerunner of Indo-European religion.  In his analysis of the Indo-European household, in Chapter II "The House Spirit", Section 1, he states:

In Section 2 he proceeds to elaborate:

 George Henderson (1911) 
George Henderson elaborated on the presumed origin of ancestor worship in animism:

 List 

 Specific deities 
Domestic or hearth goddesses from various mythologies include:

 European 
 Agathodaemon in Ancient Greek religion
 Aitvaras in Lithuanian mythology
 Berehynia (originally a river spirit, since 1991 has become a hearth goddess in Ukrainian Romantic nationalism)
 Brighid, a goddess in Ancient Celtic religion
 Brownie or Urisk in Scottish folklore
 Bwbachod in Welsh folklore
 Cofgodas in Anglo-Saxon paganism
 Domovoy in Slavic paganism
 Frigg, a goddess in Old Norse religion
 Gabija, a goddess in Baltic paganism
 Haltija, or Haldjas in Finnish paganism, Finnish folklore, and Estonian folklore.
 Heinzelmännchen in German folklore
 Hestia, a goddess in Greek paganism
 Hob, Lubber fiend, and Puck in English folklore
 Húsvættir, Norse
 Jack o' the bowl in Swiss folklore
 Kikimora in Slavic paganism
 Kobold in German folklore
 Lares in Ancient Roman religion
 Lutin in French folklore
 Matka Gabia, a goddess in Slavic paganism
 Monaciello, Monachiccio, Mamucca, Lu Laùru, Aguriellu, or Mazapegol in Italian folklore
 Penates, in Ancient Roman religion
 Safa, in Ossetian mythology
 Tomte, or Nisse in Scandinavian folklore
 Trasgu in Spanish folklore and Portuguese folklore
 Vesta, a goddess of Traditional Roman religion, both state and domestic

 African 
 Bes, a god in Ancient Egyptian religion
 Ekwu, a god in Igbo Odinani

 Asian 

 Anito in prehispanic Filipino culture.
 All gashin, the most prominent being Teoju, Seongju, Jowang, or Samshin in Korean folk religion
 Bà Tổ Cô, they are women who died at a young age, unmarried, so they are worshiped by their relatives as protective goddesses of the family in Vietnamese folk religion
 Imoinu (Emoinu), a household hearth goddess in Meitei mythology and Sanamahism of Manipur 
 Kamui Fuchi, a goddess in the Ainu folklore in Japan
 Leimarel Sidabi, a household mother goddess in Meitei mythology and Sanamahism of Manipur 
Menshen, divine guardians of doors and gates in Chinese folk religion
Môn thần, divine guardians of doors and gates in Vietnamese folk religion
 Ông Bình Vôi, the god who governs everyday things in the family in Vietnamese folk religion
 Ông Mãnh Tổ, they are men who died at a young age, unmarried, so they are worshiped by their relatives as the guardian deities of the family in Vietnamese folk religion
 Ông Táo, kitchen god in Vietnamese folk religion
 Sanamahi, the most predominant god in Meitei mythology and Sanamahism of Manipur 
 Thổ Công, is the god who looks after the house in Vietnamese folk religion
 Tu Di Gong (earth deity), in Chinese folk religion
 Yumjao Leima (Yumjao Lairembi), a household mother goddess in Meitei mythology and Sanamahism of Manipur 
 Zao Jun (kitchen god), in Chinese folk religion
 Zashiki-warashi, in Japanese folklore

 North American 
 Chantico, a goddess in Aztec mythology

 Other 
 I Gudli Saibia, a female guardian angel in Romani mythology
Patron saints, venerated saints who protect grottos, gardens, churches, and temples in Catholicism

 See also 
 Chinese ancestral worship
 Ancestral shrine and Ancestral tablets
 Dharmapala
Kitchen God

 References 

Bibliography
[SF]  Freud, Sigmund.  Totem und Tabu: Einige Übereinstimmungen im Seelenleben der Wilden und der Neurotiker. 1913.  (English translation Totem and Taboo: Resemblances Between the Mental Lives of Savages and Neurotics, 1918.)  Third essay, "Animism, Magic and the Omnipotence of Thought".
[JG]  Grimm, Jacob.  Deutsche Mythologie (Teutonic Mythology). Göttingen, 1835, 3rd ed., 1854, 2 vols.  English translation available online at http://www.northvegr.org/lore/grimmst/017_12.php
[DWB] Grimm, Jacob, and Wilhelm Grimm.  Deutsches Wörterbuch (German Dictionary).  Available online in German at http://germazope.uni-trier.de/Projects/DWB.
[WEH] Hearn, William Edward. 1878. London: Longman, Green & Co.  The Aryan Household, Its Structure and Its Development: An Introduction to Comparative Jurisprudence.  "Chapter II: The House Spirit". Available online at https://books.google.com/books?name=9663WttGfbUC&pg=PA39.
[LH]  Hearn,Lafcadio.  Japan, an Attempt at Interpretation".  The Macmillan Company, New York, 1904. Available online at
[GH]  Henderson, George.  "The Finding of the Soul", in Survivals in Belief Among the Celts, I.2.  [1911]. Available online at Survivals in Belief Among the Celts: I. The Finding of the Soul (part 2).
[HH]  Heine, Heinrich. Zur Geschichte der Religion und Philosophie in Deutschland ("Concerning the History of Religion and Philosophy in Germany".)
[TK]  Keightly, Thomas.  The Fairy Mythology: Illustrative of the Romance and Superstition of Various Countries.  1870.  Available online at The Fairy Mythology: Germany: Kobolds.
[JHM] MacMichael, J. Holden .  "The Evil Eye and the Solar Emblem", in The Antiquary, XLIII, Jan-Dec 1907, p 426.   Edward Walford et al., eds.  London: 1907. ... Available online at Google Books.
[NIE]  The New International Encyclopaedia, Coit et al., eds.  Dodd, Mead & Co., 1911.  Available online at Japan, An Attempt at Interpretation Index.

External links

 

Roman deities
Tutelary deities